Hailey Duke (born September 17, 1985, in Sun Valley, Idaho) is an alpine skier who skied for United States at the 2010 Winter Olympics. Her original athletic interest was taekwondo, but she later began focusing more on ski racing in her teens. She won silver at the U.S. national slalom and has had four slalom podiums on the Europa Cup. Her father, named Larry Duke is a Ski instructor and Taekwondo teacher.

References

Further reading

External links

1985 births
Living people
People from Sun Valley, Idaho
Alpine skiers at the 2010 Winter Olympics
American female alpine skiers
Olympic alpine skiers of the United States
21st-century American women